Dirty Dancing is the third studio album by the group Swayzak, released September 24, 2002.

Track listing 
"Make Up Your Mind" (feat. Clair Dietrich) (James Brown, Clair Dietrich, Taylor) - 4:45
"Buffalo Seven" (feat. Klaus Kotai) (Brown, Klaus Kotai, Taylor) - 5:14
"In the Car Crash" (feat. Headgear) (Konrad Black, James Brown, March21, Taylor) - 6:09
"Celsius" (Brown, Taylor) - 5:52
"I Dance Alone" (feat. Carl Finlow & Nicola Kuperus) (Adult., Brown, Carl Finlow, Taylor) - 4:25
"The Punk Era" (Brown, Taylor) - 3:55
"Halfway to Yesterday" (feat. Jeremy) (Brown, March21, Taylor) - 3:11
"Take My Hand" (Brown, Taylor) - 4:31
"Sob 1" (feat. Clair Dietrich) (Brown, Dietrich, Taylor) - 6:11
"Ping Pong" (Brown, Taylor) - 7:20

Personnel 

Adult. – vocals
Rashad Becker – mastering
David Brown – producer
Clair Dietrich – vocals
Carl Finlow – vocals
Headgear – vocals
Kotai – vocals
Swayzak – vocals
James Taylor – producer

Citations and references

External links
 Official website discography

2002 albums
Swayzak albums